The Centres de Recherche en Nutrition Humaine or CRNHs is a network of human nutrition research centres in France. Their goal is to improve the knowledge on the functional properties of food, on metabolism and on human physiology, from basic research to the study of behaviours and their impact on health. France has four CRNH which share common tools and complementary scientific skills that allow them to develop multi-center programs using their platforms and specific skills.

Nutritional issues are of major importance as populations around the world are considerably changing their diet and lifestyle with large health consequences. Food related-diseases such as obesity, diabetes, cardiovascular diseases, malnutrition and cancers are becoming major public health issues. CRNHs has the ambition to provide scientific answers to nutrition related health issues by promoting science and accelerating technology transfer to society.  CRNHs contributes to technology transfer between hospital sectors, research laboratories and industries. CRNHs’ expertise, its platforms for clinical exploration, analysis and data processing offer significant opportunities for collaborations. CRNHs develops research programs in nutrition within the framework of national, European and international research programs, working closely with industry partners and researchers worldwide.
To advise on strategic development, CRNHs has been endowed with an external scientific advisory board composed of experts from several European nations.

CRNHs missions 
- Create a research pole of experts

- Coordinate and lead multicentric research program to improve the knowledge in human nutrition

- Create a platform between laboratories and hospitals for the translational research

- Answer to public health major issues by giving a scientific answer to the nutrition problem

Organisation 

Director : Pr Martine Laville (CRNH Rhône Alpes)
Co-directors : Pr Noel Cano (CRNH Auvergne), Alain Grynberg (CRNH Ile de France), Pr Michel Krempf (CRNH Ouest)

In France there is now four CRNH having common tools and complementary scientific skills.

CRNH Ouest 

Target tissues

 Perinatal nutrition 
 Brain and enteric nervous system
 Lipids and chronic diseases
 Allergy

CRNH Auvergne 

Nutrition in elderly and in chronic diseases

- Skeletal Muscle and Bone: sarcopenia and osteoporosis

- Cardiovascular : prevention of metabolic syndrome and atherosclerosis, metabolomics, food metabolome

- Gastro-intestinal: digestive pain, microbiota

- Hormone-dependent cancer: nutrition, breast and prostate cancer

CRNH Ile de France 

Human dietary behaviour

- Nutritional Epidemiology and cohorts, food economy

- Adipose tissue

- Cardiovascular

- Gastro-intestinal

- Endocrinology

CRNH Rhône Alpes 

Obesity, Diabetes, Physical Activity

- Nutrition, health and well-being,

- Clinical nutrition, aging and chronic diseases

- Health properties of food and diet

- Lipid/lipoprotein metabolism and cardio metabolic risks

- Relationship between sedentary behaviour and health consequences

See also
 Centre de recherche en nutrition humaine Rhône-Alpes

References

External links
 CRNHs portal
 CRNH Auvergne
 CRNH Île-de-France
 CRNH Nantes 
 CRNH Rhône-Alpes

Nutrition
Medical and health organizations based in France